Jerilyn Britz (born January 1, 1943) was an American professional golfer on the LPGA Tour. She won the 1979 U.S. Women's Open.

Born in Minneapolis, Minnesota, Britz attended Minnesota State University, Mankato (then called Mankato State University) and the University of New Mexico. She is in the Minnesota State Maverick Athletic Hall of Fame.

Britz spent five years working as a high school teacher and three years as a college instructor before making her LPGA Tour debut at age 31 in 1974.

During her 26-year career on the tour, Britz won twice. Her first win came in 1979 at a major championship, the U.S. Women's Open; the second was at the Mary Kay Classic in Texas in 1980. Britz also had two runner-up finishes in major championships, at the LPGA Championship in 1979 and 1981. Her best finish on the LPGA Tour money list was 14th in 1980, and she played her last tour event in 1999.

Britz finished fifth in the 1980 Women's Superstars competition.

Professional wins

LPGA Tour wins (2)

LPGA Tour playoff record (1–0)

Major championships

Wins (1)

References

External links

American female golfers
LPGA Tour golfers
Winners of LPGA major golf championships
Golfers from Minneapolis
Minnesota State University, Mankato alumni
New Mexico Lobos athletes
People from Seminole County, Florida
People from Rock County, Minnesota
1943 births
Living people
21st-century American women